Yachad ("together") is a non-governmental organization based in the United Kingdom. It describes itself as "pro-Israel, pro-peace".

Yachad asserts that "Israel's best hope for safety and security lies in a comprehensive peace with its neighbors. That means a two-state solution: Israel and Palestine." According to Yachad, "time is running out and the two-state solution is in peril". Facing this situation, "Now is the moment for diaspora Jews to play their part and do all they can in the search for peace."

Yachad has a wide-ranging programme of activities through campaigns that claim to aim to build support for those in Israel working for peace and democracy. Yachad organizes day trips to East Jerusalem and the southern West Bank. They also work with British Jews — youth and adults – to promote their beliefs.

During the 2014 Israel–Gaza conflict Yachad organised 1000 members of the British Jewish community, to lobby Mark Lyall Grant — as UK ambassador, then President of the United Nations Security Council — to secure a ceasefire between Israel and Gaza.

References

External links
 

Non-governmental organizations involved in the Israeli–Palestinian peace process
Peace organisations based in the United Kingdom
Organizations established in 2011